The Good Old Days is a BBC television light entertainment programme produced by Barney Colehan which ran for 30 years from 20 July 1953 to 31 December 1983.

It was performed at the Leeds City Varieties and recreated an authentic atmosphere of the Victorian–Edwardian music hall with songs and sketches of the era performed in the style of the original artistes.

The audience dressed in period costume and joined in the singing, especially "Down at the Old Bull and Bush" which closed the show each week. The show was compered throughout its whole run (except for the first two shows) by Leonard Sachs, who introduced the acts from a desk situated at the side of the stage. In the course of its run it featured about 2,000 performers. Each show was up to an hour long.

The orchestra pit was deliberately visible in front of the main stage. The orchestra leader for many years was Bernard Herrmann (not the American film composer, but a flautist and later conductor with the BBC Northern Dance Orchestra).

History
Early in 1953 Barney Colehan devised a one-off show entitled "The Story of the Music Hall" presented by Deryck Guyler. The programme proved so popular that it was decided to create a series under the title of "The Good Old Days".

The show was first broadcast on 20 July 1953 and the first two shows were compered by Don Gemmell. Early series of the show were broadcast live. The show included many regulars such as 
Joan Sterndale-Bennett, Tessie O'Shea, Dudley Stevens, Hattie Jacques, Loraine Hart, Ray Alan, Roy Castle, Roy Hudd, Ken Dodd, Barbara Windsor, Eartha Kitt, Danny La Rue, Hylda Baker, Les Dawson, Larry Grayson, Tommy Steele, Frankie Vaughan and Arthur Askey.

Critical to the show, it was not only the performers who were "in character": the entire audience was required to dress in period costume, adding greatly to the atmosphere and allowing shots of the audience to be interspersed with the acts, particularly in the multiple sing-along acts.

The Good Old Days was inspired by the success of the "Ridgeway's Late Joys" at the Players' Theatre Club in London: a private members' club that ran fortnightly programmes of variety acts in London's West End. The club was originally founded by Leonard Sachs and business partner Peter Ridgeway.

Out of 245 episodes, 108 are believed to survive complete in the archives. 63 of the surviving programmes were rebroadcast on BBC Four between December 2015 and February 2018.

On 16 December 1983, Goodbye to the Good Old Days was shown, a documentary celebrating the end of the 30-year run that year; Barry Cryer served as narrator for the documentary. The final show aired on New Year's Eve that year.

The pattern of the performances and compering were reassuring in their regularity, normally ending with the performers of the evening coming back on stage all assembled and singing with the whole audience "Down at the Old Bull and Bush". Whilst the pattern was unwavering, the performers themselves were usually contemporary faces. However, the well-known faces were interspersed with unknown acts if they represented a traditional style: tap-dancing duos; comedy acrobatics etc.

References

External links
'1950's British TV Milestones', Whirligig (2003). Retrieved 1 June 2005.
'History Of The Players' Theatre Club', The Players' Theatre (2004). Retrieved 1 June 2005.

1953 British television series debuts
1983 British television series endings
1950s British television series
1960s British television series
1970s British television series
1980s British television series
BBC Television shows
Black-and-white British television shows
English-language television shows
Mass media in Leeds
Mass media in Yorkshire
British variety television shows
Music hall